Donald Leith Symington (August 30, 1925 – July 24, 2013) was an American stage, film and television actor. He appeared in such movies and television shows as Annie Hall (as Annie Hall's father), Spring Break, and Fantasy Island.

Partial filmography

References

External links

1925 births
2013 deaths
20th-century American male actors
21st-century American male actors
Male actors from Baltimore
American male film actors
American male stage actors
American male television actors
American male comedy actors
Kent School alumni